Wijeyaraj Kumar Mahadeva is a Sri Lankan American businessman. He is the founder, and original chairman and chief executive officer (CEO), of Cognizant Technology Solutions. He was the CEO of Cognizant from 1994 to 2003 and was succeeded by Lakshmi Narayanan. Kumar held senior positions at the BBC, McKinsey, AT&T, and Dun & Bradstreet. He is a member of the Sri Lankan Tamil Ponnambalam-Coomaraswamy family, the son of Deshamanya Baku Mahadeva, a Sri Lankan civil servant who served as chairman of various banks, companies, commissions, and boards.

See also

 Cognizant Technology Solutions
 List of Tamils of Sri Lanka

References

External links

Living people
Year of birth missing (living people)
American Hindus
American people of Sri Lankan Tamil descent
American technology chief executives
Harvard Business School alumni
Sri Lankan Tamil businesspeople
Tamil businesspeople